The quantum harmonic oscillator is the quantum-mechanical analog of the classical harmonic oscillator. Because an arbitrary smooth potential can usually be approximated as a harmonic potential at the vicinity of a stable equilibrium point,  it is one of the most important model systems in quantum mechanics. Furthermore, it is one of the few quantum-mechanical systems for which an exact, analytical solution is known.

One-dimensional harmonic oscillator

Hamiltonian and energy eigenstates

The Hamiltonian of the particle is:

The first term in the Hamiltonian represents the kinetic energy of the particle, and the second term represents its potential energy, as in Hooke's law.

One may write the time-independent Schrödinger equation,

where  denotes a to-be-determined real number that will specify a time-independent energy level, or eigenvalue, and the solution   denotes that level's energy eigenstate.

One may solve the differential equation representing this eigenvalue problem in the coordinate basis, for the wave function , using a spectral method. It turns out that there is a family of solutions. In this basis, they amount to  Hermite functions,

The functions Hn are the physicists' Hermite polynomials,

The corresponding energy levels are

This energy spectrum is noteworthy for three reasons. First, the energies are quantized, meaning that only discrete energy values (integer-plus-half multiples of ) are possible; this is a general feature of quantum-mechanical systems when a particle is confined. Second, these discrete energy levels are equally spaced, unlike in the Bohr model of the atom, or the particle in a box. Because of the zero-point energy, the position and momentum of the oscillator in the ground state are not fixed (as they would be in a classical oscillator), but have a small range of variance, in accordance with the Heisenberg uncertainty principle.

The ground state probability density is concentrated at the origin, which means the particle spends most of its time at the bottom of the potential well, as one would expect for a state with little energy. As the energy increases, the probability density peaks at the classical "turning points", where the state's energy coincides with the potential energy. (See the discussion below of the highly excited states.) This is consistent with the classical harmonic oscillator, in which the particle spends more of its time (and is therefore more likely to be found) near the turning points, where it is moving the slowest. The correspondence principle is thus satisfied. Moreover, special nondispersive wave packets, with minimum uncertainty,  called coherent states oscillate very much like classical objects, as illustrated in the figure; they are not eigenstates of the Hamiltonian.

Ladder operator method

The "ladder operator" method, developed by Paul Dirac, allows extraction of the energy eigenvalues without directly solving the differential equation. It is generalizable to more complicated problems, notably in quantum field theory.  Following this approach, we define the operators  and its adjoint ,

The operator  is not Hermitian, since itself and its adjoint  are not equal. The energy eigenstates  (also known as Fock states), when operated on by these ladder operators, give

It is then evident that , in essence, appends a single quantum of energy to the oscillator, while  removes a quantum. For this reason, they are sometimes referred to as "creation" and "annihilation" operators.

From the relations above, we can also define a number operator , which has the following property:

The following commutators can be easily obtained by substituting the canonical commutation relation,

And the Hamilton operator can be expressed as

The commutation property yields

and similarly,

For this reason,  is called a annihilation operator ("lowering operator"), and  a creation operator ("raising operator"). The two operators together are called ladder operators.

Given any energy eigenstate, we can act on it with the lowering operator, to produce another eigenstate with  less energy. However, since

the smallest eigen-number is 0, and

In this case, subsequent applications of the lowering operator will just produce zero kets, instead of additional energy eigenstates. Furthermore, we have shown above that

Finally, by acting on  |0⟩ with the raising operator and multiplying by suitable normalization factors, we can produce an infinite set of energy eigenstates 

such that

which matches the energy spectrum given in the preceding section.

Arbitrary eigenstates can be expressed in terms of |0⟩,

Analytical questions

The preceding analysis is algebraic, using only the commutation relations between the raising and lowering operators. Once the algebraic analysis is complete, one should turn to analytical questions. First, one should find the ground state, that is, the solution of the equation . In the position representation, this is the first-order differential equation

whose solution is easily found to be the Gaussian

Conceptually, it is important that there is only one solution of this equation; if there were, say, two linearly independent ground states, we would get two independent chains of eigenvectors for the harmonic oscillator. Once the ground state is computed, one can show inductively that the excited states are Hermite polynomials times the Gaussian ground state, using the explicit form of the raising operator in the position representation. One can also prove that, as expected from the uniqueness of the ground state, the Hermite functions energy eigenstates  constructed by the ladder method form a complete orthonormal set of functions.

hence

so that , and so on.

Natural length and energy scales
The quantum harmonic oscillator possesses natural scales for length and energy, which can be used to simplify the problem. These can be found by nondimensionalization.

while the energy eigenfunctions and eigenvalues simplify to Hermite functions and integers offset by a half,

where  are the Hermite polynomials.

To avoid confusion,  these "natural units"   will mostly not be adopted in this article. However, they frequently come in handy when performing calculations, by bypassing clutter.

where . The most general solution for a given initial configuration  then is simply

Coherent states

The coherent states (also known as Glauber states) of the harmonic oscillator are special nondispersive wave packets, with minimum uncertainty , whose observables' expectation values evolve like a classical system.  They are eigenvectors of the annihilation operator, not the Hamiltonian, and form an overcomplete basis which consequentially lacks orthogonality.

Because  and via the Kermack-McCrae identity, the last form is equivalent to a unitary displacement operator acting on the ground state: . The position space wave functions are

Since coherent states are not energy eigenstates, their time evolution is not a simple shift in wavefunction phase. The time-evolved states are, however, also coherent states but with phase-shifting parameter  instead: .

Highly excited states

When  is large, the eigenstates are localized into the classical allowed region, that is, the region in which a classical particle with energy  can move. The eigenstates are peaked near the turning points: the points at the ends of the classically allowed region where the classical particle changes direction. This phenomenon can be verified through asymptotics of the Hermite polynomials,  and also through the WKB approximation. 

The system behavior in a small neighborhood of the turning point does not have a simple classical explanation, but can be modeled using an Airy function. Using properties of the Airy function,  one may estimate the probability of finding the particle outside the classically allowed region,  to be approximately 

This is also given, asymptotically, by the integral

Phase space solutions
In the phase space formulation of quantum mechanics, eigenstates of the quantum harmonic oscillator in several different representations of the quasiprobability distribution can be written in closed form. The most widely used of these is for the Wigner quasiprobability distribution.

The Wigner quasiprobability distribution for the energy eigenstate  is, in the natural units described above,

where Ln are the Laguerre polynomials. This example illustrates how the Hermite and Laguerre polynomials are linked through the Wigner map.

Meanwhile, the Husimi Q function of the harmonic oscillator eigenstates have an even simpler form. If we work in the natural units described above, we have

This claim can be verified using the Segal–Bargmann transform. At this point, we can appeal to the formula for the Husimi Q function in terms of the Segal–Bargmann transform.

N-dimensional isotropic harmonic oscillator

The one-dimensional harmonic oscillator is readily generalizable to  dimensions, where . In one dimension, the position of the particle was specified by a single coordinate, . In  dimensions, this is replaced by  position coordinates, which we label . Corresponding to each position coordinate is a momentum; we label these . The canonical commutation relations between these operators are

The Hamiltonian for this system is

As the form of this Hamiltonian makes clear, the -dimensional harmonic oscillator is exactly analogous to  independent one-dimensional harmonic oscillators with the same mass and spring constant. In this case, the quantities  would refer to the positions of each of the  particles. This is a convenient property of the  potential, which allows the potential energy to be separated into terms depending on one coordinate each.

This observation makes the solution straightforward. For a particular set of quantum numbers  the energy eigenfunctions for the -dimensional oscillator are expressed in terms of the 1-dimensional eigenfunctions as:

In the ladder operator method, we define  sets of ladder operators,

The Hamiltonian is

This Hamiltonian is invariant under the dynamic symmetry group  (the unitary group in  dimensions), defined by

The energy levels of the system are

As in the one-dimensional case, the energy is quantized. The ground state energy is  times the one-dimensional ground energy, as we would expect using the analogy to  independent one-dimensional oscillators. There is one further difference: in the one-dimensional case, each energy level corresponds to a unique quantum state. In -dimensions, except for the ground state, the energy levels are degenerate, meaning there are several states with the same energy.

The degeneracy can be calculated relatively easily. As an example, consider the 3-dimensional case: Define . All states with the same  will have the same energy. For a given , we choose a particular . Then . The degree of degeneracy therefore is:

Formula for general  and  [ being the dimension of the symmetric irreducible -th power representation of the unitary group ]:

The special case  = 3, given above, follows directly from this general equation. This is however, only true for distinguishable particles, or one particle in  dimensions (as dimensions are distinguishable).

Example: 3D isotropic harmonic oscillator

The Schrödinger equation for a particle in a spherically-symmetric three-dimensional harmonic oscillator can be solved explicitly by separation of variables; see this article for the present case. This procedure is analogous to the separation performed in the hydrogen-like atom problem, but with a different spherically symmetric potential

where  is the mass of the particle.

The solution reads

where
 is a normalization constant; ;
 
are generalized Laguerre polynomials; The order   of the polynomial is a non-negative integer;
 is a spherical harmonic function;
 is the reduced Planck constant: 

The energy eigenvalue is

The energy is usually described by the single quantum number

Because  is a non-negative integer, for every even  we have  and for every odd   we have  . Thus, the degeneracy at level  is

where the sum starts from 0 or 1, according to whether  is even or odd.

Applications

Harmonic oscillators lattice: phonons

We can extend the notion of a harmonic oscillator to a one-dimensional lattice of many particles. Consider a one-dimensional quantum mechanical harmonic chain of N identical atoms. This is the simplest quantum mechanical model of a lattice, and we will see how phonons arise from it. The formalism that we will develop for this model is readily generalizable to two and three dimensions.

The Hamiltonian for this system is

However, it is customary to rewrite the Hamiltonian in terms of the normal modes of the wavevector rather than in terms of the particle coordinates so that one can work in the more convenient Fourier space.

We introduce, then, a set of  "normal coordinates" , defined as the discrete Fourier transforms of the s, and  "conjugate momenta"   defined as the Fourier transforms of the s,

The quantity  will turn out to be the wave number of the phonon, i.e. 2π  divided by the wavelength. It takes on quantized values, because the number of atoms is finite.

This preserves the desired commutation relations in either real space or wave vector space

From the general result

it is easy to show, through elementary trigonometry, that the potential energy term is

where

The Hamiltonian may be written in wave vector space as

Note that the couplings between the position variables have been transformed away; if the s and s were hermitian (which they are not), the transformed Hamiltonian would describe  uncoupled harmonic oscillators.

The form of the quantization depends on the choice of boundary conditions; for simplicity, we impose periodic boundary conditions, defining the -th atom as equivalent to the first atom. Physically, this corresponds to joining the chain at its ends. The resulting quantization is

The upper bound to  comes from the minimum wavelength, which is twice the lattice spacing , as discussed above.

The harmonic oscillator eigenvalues or energy levels for the mode  are 

If we ignore the zero-point energy then the levels are evenly spaced at 

So an exact amount of energy ,  must be supplied to the harmonic oscillator lattice to push it to the next energy level. In analogy to the photon case when the electromagnetic field is quantised, the quantum of vibrational energy is called a phonon.

All quantum systems show wave-like and particle-like properties. The particle-like properties of the phonon are best understood using the methods of second quantization and operator techniques described elsewhere.

In the continuum limit, while  is held fixed. The canonical coordinates  devolve to the decoupled momentum modes of a scalar field, whilst the location index  (not the displacement dynamical variable) becomes the parameter  argument of the scalar field, .

Molecular vibrations

 The vibrations of a diatomic molecule are an example of a two-body version of the quantum harmonic oscillator.
 The Hooke's atom is a simple model of the helium atom using the quantum harmonic oscillator.
 Modelling phonons, as discussed above.
 A charge  with mass  in a uniform magnetic field  is an example of a one-dimensional quantum harmonic oscillator: Landau quantization.

See also

Quantum pendulum
Quantum machine
Gas in a harmonic trap
Creation and annihilation operators
Coherent state
Morse potential
Bertrand's theorem
Mehler kernel
Molecular vibration

References

External links
Quantum Harmonic Oscillator
Rationale for choosing the ladder operators
 Live 3D intensity plots of quantum harmonic oscillator
Driven and damped quantum harmonic oscillator (lecture notes of course "quantum optics in electric circuits")

Quantum models
Oscillators